Choppadandi is a town Choppadandi constituency  of Karimnagar district in the state of Telangana in India.

Geography 
It has an average elevation of 304 meters (1000 feet). It is located 19 km towards North from District headquarters Karimnagar. The Shiva Keshava temple located in the village. Choppadandi consist of 23 villages and 15 village panchayats.

References 

Villages in Karimnagar district
Mandal headquarters in Karimnagar district